William Roger "Bill" Callahan (November 7, 1931 - April 6, 2022) was a journalist and former politician in Newfoundland. He represented Port au Port from 1966 to 1971 in the Newfoundland House of Assembly.

The son of William B. Callahan and Alice M. Rogers, he was born in St. John's and was educated there, in Corner Brook and at St. Augustine's Seminary in Toronto. From 1949 to 1953, he was a reporter and photographer for The Western Star in Corner Brook. Callahan next worked as the news director and later sports director for CJON Radio and TV. In 1956, he became editor for the newspaper on the Pepperrell Air Force Base. From 1959 to 1966, he was managing and editorial page editor for the Western Star. Callahan also served as senior executive at The Evening Telegram.

He was elected to the Newfoundland assembly in 1966; Callahan served in the provincial cabinet as Minister of Mines, Agriculture and Resources. In 1971, he became publisher for The Daily News'' in St. John's.

Callahan married Daphne Marie Ryan; the couple had six children.

In 2015, he received a Lifetime Achievement Award at the Atlantic Journalism Awards.

Callahan is also the author of two books, Joseph Roberts Smallwood: Journalist, Premier, Newfoundland Patriot, and The Banting Enigma (both Flanker Press).

References 

1931 births
Living people
Canadian male journalists
Canadian newspaper editors
Journalists from Newfoundland and Labrador
Liberal Party of Newfoundland and Labrador MHAs
Politicians from St. John's, Newfoundland and Labrador